Jonathan Erlichman, nicknamed "J-Money", is a Canadian professional baseball coach for the Tampa Bay Rays of Major League Baseball (MLB). He is the first analytics coach in MLB.

Career
Erlichman is from Yonge-Eglinton, Toronto, Ontario. His only experience as a baseball player was in t-ball at the age of five. At age 13, Erlichman read Moneyball, which cultivated his interest in baseball analytics. He attended the prestigious Upper Canada College for his secondary education, where he further developed his mathematical prowess.

Erlichman earned a bachelor's degree in mathematics from Princeton University in 2012. Erlichman then worked as an intern for the Toronto Blue Jays. He obtained his first fulltime job from the Rays in January 2013, and in December 2016 became their director of analytics. In December 2018, the Rays named Erlichman to their coaching staff as MLB's first process and analytics coach.

Personal
His cousin, Michael Cammalleri, played in the National Hockey League for 15 seasons.

References

External links

Living people
Baseball players from Toronto
Canadian baseball coaches
Canadian expatriate baseball people in the United States
Princeton University alumni
Tampa Bay Rays coaches
Tampa Bay Rays executives
Year of birth missing (living people)